is a railway station in the city of Murakami, Niigata, Japan, operated by East Japan Railway Company (JR East).

Lines
Murakami Station is served by the Uetsu Main Line, and is 59.4 kilometers from the starting point of the line at Niitsu Station.

Station layout
The station consists of one  side platform and one island platform connected by a footbridge. The station has a Midori no Madoguchi staffed ticket office.

Platforms

History
Murakami Station opened on 1 November 1914. The station building was rebuilt in 1964. With the privatization of Japanese National Railways (JNR) on 1 April 1987, the station came under the control of JR East.

Passenger statistics
In fiscal 2017, the station was used by an average of 1663 passengers daily (boarding passengers only).

Surrounding area
 
Murakami City Hall
Murakami Post Office
Murakami General Hospital
Senami Onsen

See also
 List of railway stations in Japan

References

External links

 JR East station information 

Stations of East Japan Railway Company
Railway stations in Niigata Prefecture
Uetsu Main Line
Railway stations in Japan opened in 1914
Murakami, Niigata